Minnesota State Highway 219 (MN 219) is a  highway in northwest Minnesota, which runs from its intersection with State Highway 1 near Goodridge and continues north to its northern terminus at its intersection with State Highway 89 near Grygla.

MN 219 passes through the communities of Goodridge Township, Goodridge, Moylan Township, and Eckvoll Township.

Route description
Highway 219 serves as a north–south connector route between State Highway 1 and State Highway 89, as well as serves the city of Goodridge.  Highway 89 continues north to the city of Roseau.

Agassiz National Wildlife Refuge is located west of the junction of Highway 219 and County State-Aid Highway 7 in Marshall County.  The nearby refuge surrounds Mud Lake on County State-Aid Highway 7.

The route is legally defined as Route 219 in the Minnesota Statutes.

History
Highway 219 was authorized on July 1, 1949.

The short section between Highway 1 and Goodridge was paved in 1950. The remainder of the route was paved in 1954 or 1955.

Major intersections

References

External links

Highway 219 at the Unofficial Minnesota Highways Page

219
Transportation in Pennington County, Minnesota
Transportation in Marshall County, Minnesota